The 2005–06 season was the 107th season of competitive league football in the history of English football club Wolverhampton Wanderers. They played the season in the 2nd tier of the English football system, the Football League Championship.

The team finished in seventh place, falling nine points short of a place in the promotion play-offs. Following this season, a summer of changes occurred with manager Glenn Hoddle resigning and many of the club's first team players departing.

Results

Pre season
Pre season began on 27 June with a week training at the National Sports Centre at Lilleshall. The squad then spent a week in Montecastillo, Spain during 4–10 July.

Football League Championship

A total of 24 teams competed in the Championship during the 2005–06 season. Each team would play every other team twice, once at their stadium, and once at the opposition's. Three points were awarded to teams for each win, one point per draw, and none for defeats. The provisional fixture list was released on 23 June 2005, but was subject to change in the event of matches being selected for television coverage or police concerns.

Final table

Results summary

Results by round

FA Cup

League Cup

Players

Statistics

|-
|align="left"|||align="left"|||align="left"|  
|||0||0||0||0||0||||0||0||0||
|-
|align="left"|||align="left"|||align="left"| 
|0||0||0||0||0||0||0||0||0||0||
|-
|align="left"|||align="left"|||align="left"| 
|||1||1||0||1||0||||1||4||0||
|-
|align="left"|||align="left"|||align="left"| 
|||0||0||0||1||0||||0||0||0||
|-
|align="left"|||align="left"|||align="left"| 
|46||1||2||0||||0||||1||3||0||
|-
|align="left"|||align="left"|||align="left"|  
|||0||0||0||1||0||||0||0||0||
|-
|align="left"|||align="left"|||align="left"| 
|||0||0||0||||0||style="background:#98FB98"|||0||4||0||
|-
|align="left"|||align="left"|||align="left"|  (c)
|||3||2||0||0||0||||3||1||0||
|-
|align="left"|||align="left"|FW||align="left"| 
|||4||0||0||||1||||5||0||1||
|-
|align="left"|10||align="left"|||align="left"|  ¤
|||4||||0||2||2||||6||5||1||
|-
|align="left"|11||align="left"|||align="left"| 
|||2||2||0||1||0||||2||7||0||
|-
|align="left"|12||align="left"|||align="left"|  
|||0||1||0||2||0||||0||2||0||
|-
|align="left"|13||align="left"|||align="left"|  †
|0||0||0||0||0||0||0||0||0||0||
|-
|align="left"|14||align="left"|||align="left"| 
|||1||1||0||||1||style="background:#98FB98"|||2||1||0||
|-
|align="left"|15||align="left"|||align="left"| 
|||2||||0||0||0||style="background:#98FB98"|||2||0||0||
|-
|align="left"|16||align="left"|FW||align="left"| 
|||10||2||0||2||2||||12||11||0||
|-
|align="left"|17||align="left"|||style="background:#faecc8" align="left"|  ‡
|||0||1||0||0||0||style="background:#98FB98"|||0||5||0||
|-
|align="left"|18||align="left"|FW||align="left"|  † 
|||1||0||0||||0||||1||0||0||
|-
|align="left"|19||align="left"|||align="left"| 
|||4||2||0||2||0||||4||3||0||
|-
|align="left"|20||align="left"|||align="left"|  ¤
|||0||0||0||0||0||||0||0||0||
|-
|align="left"|21||align="left"|||align="left"|  ¤ †
|0||0||0||0||0||0||0||0||0||0||
|-
|align="left"|21||align="left"|FW||style="background:#faecc8" align="left"|  ‡
|||2||0||0||0||0||style="background:#98FB98"|||2||3||0||
|-
|align="left"|22||align="left"|||style="background:#faecc8" align="left"|  ‡ 
|||1||0||0||0||0||style="background:#98FB98"|||1||2||0||
|-
|align="left"|24||align="left"|||style="background:#faecc8" align="left"|  ‡ 
|||0||2||0||2||0||style="background:#98FB98"|||0||5||0||
|-
|align="left"|25||align="left"|||style="background:#faecc8" align="left"|  ‡ 
|29||0||2||0||0||0||style="background:#98FB98"|29||0||0||0||
|-
|align="left"|27||align="left"|FW||align="left"| 
|||11||||0||0||0||||11||0||0||
|-
|align="left"|28||align="left"|||align="left"|  
|||0||0||0||||0||||0||2||0||
|-
|align="left"|30||align="left"|||align="left"|  ¤
|0||0||0||0||1||0||style="background:#98FB98"|||0||0||0||
|-
|align="left"|32||align="left"|||align="left"|  ¤ †
|0||0||0||0||0||0||0||0||0||0||
|-
|align="left"|32||align="left"|FW||align="left"| 
|||0||||0||0||0||style="background:#98FB98"|||0||0||0||
|-
|align="left"|33||align="left"|FW||align="left"|  ¤
|||1||1||1||1||0||||2||3||0||
|-
|align="left"|34||align="left"|||align="left"|  ¤
|||0||0||0||0||0||style="background:#98FB98"|||0||0||0||
|-
|align="left"|36||align="left"|||align="left"| 
|||0||0||0||0||0||style="background:#98FB98"|||0||0||0||
|-
|align="left"|37||align="left"|||align="left"|  ¤
|0||0||0||0||0||0||0||0||0||0||
|-
|align="left"|39||align="left"|||align="left"| 
|||1||||0||2||0||style="background:#98FB98"|||1||3||0||
|-
|align="left"|40||align="left"|||align="left"|  ¤
|||0||0||0||0||0||||0||0||0||
|}

Awards

Transfers

In

Out

Loans in

Loans out

Kit
The previous season's home kit was retained, featuring the club's traditional gold and black colours. The season however saw a new away kit introduced that was an all-black design, with gold piping on the shirt. Last season's navy blue and white away kit was also retained for this season. The kits were manufactured by Le Coq Sportif and featured Chaucer Consulting as sponsor for a second season.

References

External links
2005–06 season at wolves-stats.co.uk

Wolverhampton Wanderers
Wolverhampton Wanderers F.C. seasons